is a Japanese chemist and president of Tokyo University of Science. He is known for significant contributions to the discovery and research of photocatalytic and superhydrophilic properties of titanium dioxide (TiO2), which is also known as the Honda-Fujishima effect.

Career and research
In 1966 he earned his B. A. (Engineering) at the Faculty of Engineering, Yokohama National University, and in 1971 his Ph.D. (Engineering) at the Graduate School of Engineering, the University of Tokyo.

In 1967, while working on his Ph.D. under the supervision of professor Kenichi Honda (本多 健一), he discovered the phenomenon of photocatalytic water decomposition (water photolysis) when he exposed a titanium dioxide electrode to strong light, later called the Honda-Fujishima effect.
The discovery of self-cleaning properties of titanium dioxide by the group under his supervision initiated a  revolution in the ceramic, glass, and other industries (see e.g., self-cleaning glass).

On completing his Ph.D. in 1971 he became assistant professor at Kanagawa University but returned to the University of Tokyo in 1975 as assistant professor in the Department of Applied Chemistry. He was promoted to associate professor in 1978 and professor in 1986 within the same department. He became professor emeritus in 2003 and special university professor emeritus in 2005.

In 1989	he was appointed executive director of the Chemical Society of Japan. In 1998	he became chief of the optical science group at Kanagawa Academy of Science and Technology Research,  and president of the Japanese Photochemistry Association.  In 1999	he was founder editor-in-chief of the editorial panel of the Journal of Photochemistry and Photobiology C: Photochemistry Reviews  In 2001, he was nominated vice president of the Chemical Society of Japan, becoming its president in 2006.

In 2002	he was research supervisor for the development of advanced nanostructured materials for energy conversion and storage at the Japan Science and Technology Agency (JST).  In 2003	he became president of the Electrochemical Society of Japan.
and chairman of the Kanagawa Academy of Science and Technology.  In 2010, Fujishima became the ninth president of Tokyo University of Science.

Recognition
Akira Fujishima has been the recipient of many prestigious awards and honours.

In 1983 he was awarded the Asahi Prize from the Asahi Shimbun. He received the Award for Research Excellence from the Electrochemical Society of Japan in 1987.

In 1998	he received the Inoue Harushige Award for technical innovation from the Research Development Corporation of Japan and the Innovations in Real Materials Award.

In 1999 he received the Award of the Electrochemical Society of Japan 1999 and in the following year, 2000, the	Chemical Society of Japan Award

In 2003	he was the recipient of the Heinz Gerischer Award of the European Section of The Electrochemical Society and Japan's Medal with Purple Ribbon. The following year he was further recognised in his own country when in 2004 he received both the Japan Prize and the Japan Academy Prize

In 2006 he received the National Commendation for Invention Award and the Kanagawa Culture Award.

In 2012 he received the Laurea Honoris Causa in chemistry of the environment from the University of Turin.

In 2017 he received the Order of Culture from the Emperor of Japan.

References

Japanese chemists
1942 births
People from Tokyo
University of Tokyo alumni
Academic staff of Kanagawa University
Academic staff of the University of Tokyo
Living people
Yokohama National University alumni
Recipients of the Order of Culture
Foreign members of the Chinese Academy of Engineering